Behind The Player: Tim Skold is an interactive music video featuring Marilyn Manson guitarist/bassist/producer Tim Skold
. Released on November 1, 2008 by IMV, the DVD features Tim giving in-depth guitar and bass lessons for how to play "Putting Holes in Happiness" by Marilyn Manson and an intimate behind-the scenes look at his life as a professional musician, including rare photos and video.  The DVD also includes Tim jamming the tracks with Jane's Addiction drummer Stephen Perkins, VideoTab that shows exactly how Tim plays his parts in the two songs, as well as other bonus material.

IMV donates $.25 from the sale of each Behind the Player DVD to Little Kids Rock, an organization that gets instruments in the hands of underprivileged kids.

Contents
Behind The Player
Tim talks about his background, influences and gear, including rare photos and video

"Putting Holes in Happiness" by Marilyn Manson Guitar Lesson
Lesson: Tim gives an in-depth lesson for how to play the guitar part in the song
Jam: Tim jams the track with Jane's Addiction drummer Stephen Perkins
VideoTab: Animated tablature shows exactly how Tim plays guitar on the track

"Putting Holes in Happiness" by Marilyn Manson Bass Lesson
Lesson: Tim gives an in-depth lesson for how to play the bass part in the song
Jam: Tim jams the track with Jane's Addiction drummer Stephen Perkins
VideoTab: Animated tablature shows exactly how Tim plays bass on the track

Special features
Bonus Video Clip
Photo Album
Little Kids Rock promotional video

Personnel

Produced By: Ken Mayer & Sean E Demott
Directed By: Dean Karr
Producer: Leon Melas
Executive Producer: Rick Donaleshen
Director Of Photography: Paulo Cascio
Sound Engineer: Matt Chidgey
Edited By: Jeff Morose
Mixed By: Sean Lacefield
Graphics By: Thayer DeMay
Transcription By: Thayer DeMay
Camera Operators: Mike Chateneuf, Brian Silva, Doug Cragoe, Joe Hendrick
Technical Directors: Tyler Bourns & Chris Golde
Gaffer: John Parker

Assistant Director: Matt Pick
Lighting And Grip: Mcnulty Nielson
Key Grip: Jaletta Kalman
Artist Hospitality: Sasha Mayer
Shot At: Third Encore
Cover Photo By: Dean Karr
Special Guest: Stephen Perkins
Video Courtesy Of: Tobias Rudolf, Cyril Riandet, Charles Koutris, Peter “Videopete” Sicard, Harry Cody
Photos Courtesy Of: Dean Karr, Marty Temme, Steve Jennings, Mark Bolduc, Charles Koutris, Bob Mussell
Photo Library Complements Of: Ultimaterockpix.Com

References

External links

Behind the Player